Dosco can refer to :

 Doon School alumni, or Doscos
 Dominion Steel and Coal Corporation, or DOSCO